Parks is an English surname. Notable people with the surname include:
Alan Parks (1920-1982), British surgeon
 Alan Parks (writer) (born 1963), Scottish crime writer
 Alex Parks (born 1984), English singer-songwriter
 Bernard C. Parks (born 1943), American politician, former chief of the Los Angeles Police Department
 Bert Parks (1914–1992), American actor, singer, and radio and television announcer
 Billy Parks (1948–2009), American football player
 Bobby Parks (1961–2013), American basketball player, member of the Philippine Basketball Association Hall of Fame
 Bobby Ray Parks Jr. (born 1993), American basketball player, son of the above
 Bobby Parks (cricketer) (born 1959), English former cricketer
 Carson Parks (1936–2005), American songwriter, music publisher, musician and singer
 Clifton T. Parks (1895-1976), American lawyer and politician
 Cord Parks (born 1986), American football player in the Canadian Football League
 Dan Parks (born 1978), Australian-born former rugby union player
 Dave Parks (1941–2019), American football player
 Ed Parks (1917–1987), American football player
 Floyd B. Parks (1911–1942), decorated aviation officer in the United States Marine Corps during World War II.
 Floyd Lavinius Parks (1896–1959), a United States Army general during World War II.
 Gordon Parks (1912–2006), American photographer, musician, writer and film director
 Gordon Parks Jr. (1934–1979), American director best known for the film Super Fly, son of the above
 Gordon Parks (footballer) (born 1972), Scottish sports journalist and former footballer
 Harry Parks (cricketer) (1906–1984), English cricketer
 Harry Jeremiah Parks (1848–1927), U.S. Army soldier and Medal of Honor recipient
 J. L. Parks, American former basketball player
 James Parks (disambiguation)
 Jordan Parks (born 1994), American basketball player
 Keaton Parks (born 1997), American soccer player
 Lisa Parks, American media scholar
 Lloyd Parks (born 1948), Jamaican reggae vocalist and bass player 
 Lloyd Parks (R&B singer), American R&B/soul singer, member of Harold Melvin & the Blue Notes
 Lyman Parks (1917–2009), mayor of Grand Rapids, Michigan
 Michael Parks (1940–2017), American singer and actor
 Raymond Parks (auto racing) (1914–2010), American stock car racing team owner
 Reggie Parks (1934–2021), Canadian professional wrestler
 Robert Parks (disambiguation)
 Rosa Parks (1913–2005), African-American civil rights activist
 Sam Parks Jr. (1909–1997), American professional golfer
 Susie A. Parks (1895-1981), American switchboard operator during the Battle of Columbus
 Terrance Parks (born 1990), American football player
 Tilman Bacon Parks (1872–1950), American politician, U.S. Representative from Arkansas
 Trevin Parks (born 1991), American basketball player
 William Parks (disambiguation)

See also
 Parkes (disambiguation)

English-language surnames